WRBE may refer to:
 WRBE-FM, a radio station at 106.9 FM licensed to Lucedale, Mississippi, United States
 WVGG or WRBE, a radio station in Mobile, Alabama at 1440 AM